Cartoon Network is a French pay television channel aimed at kids, available for France, Belgium, Switzerland, Luxembourg and Francophone Africa. It was launched on 23 August 1999 and is owned by Warner Bros. Discovery International under its French division.

History
In 1993, Turner launched a free-to-air channel, Cartoon Network (during the day) timesharing with TNT Classic Movies, in Europe. Although it was legally licensed in the UK, as it transmitted from London, the French and Belgian authorities objected to the American programming available in the French language.

In June 1998, an autonomic Cartoon Network was launched for Southern Europe (France, Spain and Italy). The Italian channel became independent a few months after, and on 23 August 1999, the French and Spanish channels were split.

In 1999, all shows began to be shown in French. Cartoon Network broadcast mainly Hanna-Barbera and Warner Bros. cartoons in the early 2000s. In 2006, the channel changed its programming to aim a more modern audience by removing old shows. These shows were replaced with movies and some live-action series.

Starting in 2010, less Hanna-Barbera productions have been broadcast. Most of these were moved to sister network Boomerang. An original video game titled Cartoon Network: Punch Time Explosion XL was released on the Xbox 360 and Nintendo 3DS. In December 2012, Cartoon Network began to air the first seasons of Wakfu: The Animated Series. In early 2014, Turner announced the new series Uncle Grandpa, Steven Universe and Clarence.

Since 2014, Cartoon Network France has been available in Sub-Saharan Africa through StarTimes. On 25 July 2016, Cartoon Network France fully rebranded using graphics from the Check It 4.0 branding package. On 4 September 2017, Cartoon Network France fully rebranded using graphics from the Dimensional branding package.

Related services

Cartoon Network feeds

Cartoon Network HD
On 13 May 2014, Cartoon Network Channel HD launched on Canalsat.

Cartoon Network Switzerland 
A Swiss feed was launched on 26 February 2007. Its advertising window is operated by Goldbach Media. Unlike in France, Cartoon Network is free in all Swiss TV providers, and it is the most popular kids channel in French.

Boomerang 
Boomerang began as a block on Cartoon Network in early 2000s. On 23 April 2003, Boomerang was launched as a channel on TPS.

Cartoonito 
Cartoonito was launched as a morning preschool block on Boing on 5 September 2011. The block last aired on 5 July 2013.

In May 2021, WarnerMedia UK and EMEA announced plans to relaunching Cartoonito within their regionre-entering in Spring 2022, with its streaming service HBO Max.

It’s currently unconfirmed when  its programming block will launch on Cartoon Network.

Adult Swim
The block was launched on 4 March 2011 and aired every night from 11 p.m. to 1 a.m. on Cartoon Network Switzerland until 2015. It has aired Aqua Teen Hunger Force, Harvey Birdman, Attorney at Law, Metalocalypse, Moral Orel, Robot Chicken and Squidbillies. Like most international Adult Swim blocks, it does not air Fox and action shows. The block's programming was not dubbed and aired with English audio and French subtitles.

In the early 2000s, there was a late-night block called "Désaxé", which carried the 2001 Adult Swim look, but did not have any adult shows, except for Home Movies. Case Closed was aired on Cartoon Network and Toonami. Dezaxe aired random Cartoon Network shows and old promos.

Adult Swim relaunched as a block on Toonami in France on 24 July 2019.

Toonami 
Toonami was a block on Cartoon Network from 2002 airing action shows. It relaunched as a channel on 11 February 2016.

References

External links 

 CartoonNetwork.fr (Official French Website)

Children's television networks
Cartoon Network
Television stations in France
Turner Broadcasting System France
Television channels and stations established in 1999
1999 establishments in France
Television stations in Switzerland
Television channels in Belgium
Television stations in Morocco
Television stations in Lebanon
2007 establishments in Switzerland